Vincent Joseph Martin (14 May 1920 – 10 March 2001) was an Australian politician, the son of Joe and Elsie Martin. He attended Marist Brothers Darlinghurst, leaving school at age 14½ and entering the State and then Commonwealth public service.

Martin was secretary of the Panania branch of the Australian Labor Party from 1949, and in 1969 was elected to the Australian House of Representatives as the member for Banks. He held the seat until 1980, when he lost preselection to John Mountford.

When Martin died at Woy Woy, New South Wales in 2001, having finally succumbed to cancer, mourners included Les Johnson, Leo McLeay, Daryl Melham, Kevin Stewart, John Della Bosca, Pat Rogan, Kevin Greene, Marie Andrews, and Paul Keating.

References

Andrews, Marie (2001). Death of Vincent Joseph Martin, a Former Member of Federal Parliament, Hansard

Australian Labor Party members of the Parliament of Australia
Members of the Australian House of Representatives for Banks
Members of the Australian House of Representatives
1920 births
2001 deaths
20th-century Australian politicians